Fabrício Silva Cabral (born 16 September 1981), best known simply as Fabrício, is a Brazilian footballer.

Career
During his career, Fabrício was contracted to a number of modest Brazilian sides including Cachoeiro Futebol Clube, Americano Futebol Clube, Associação Portuguesa de Desportos, Grêmio Recreativo Barueri and Mesquita Futebol Clube. He also played three games as a forward for a South Korean K-League team Seongnam Ilhwa Chunma in 2005.

Being a free agent, he signed for Russian Premier League side Terek on 31 August 2009 until the end of the season, and was falsely introduced to the press as a well-known former Botafogo player. A one hundred sixty six-centimeter footballer, he weighed 71 kilos at that moment. His contract was terminated on 9 October 2009. In the January 2010 transfer window Fabricio arrived in Israel to try out for local club Hapoel Tel Aviv F.C. Having failed to impress, he left to go on trial at Maccabi Netanya F.C. which signed him on January 18, 2010.

References

External links
  Profile at CBF site
 
  Profile at the official Terek Grozny website
  Profile at websoccerclub.com
  Profile at soccerway.com
  Profile at conteudoesportivo.com.br
  

Brazilian footballers
Brazilian expatriate footballers
Seongnam FC players
K League 1 players
Maccabi Netanya F.C. players
Grêmio Barueri Futebol players
Sport Club Corinthians Alagoano players
Associação Portuguesa de Desportos players
Americano Futebol Clube players
Expatriate footballers in South Korea
Expatriate footballers in Israel
Brazilian expatriate sportspeople in South Korea
1981 births
Living people
Association football midfielders
FC Akhmat Grozny players
Footballers from Rio de Janeiro (city)